Gajendra Singh is an Indian politician and a member of the 16th Legislative Assembly of India. He represents the Anupshahr constituency of Uttar Pradesh and is a member of the Bahujan Samaj Party political party.

Early life and education
Gajendra Singh was born in  Dungra Jat village of Anupshahr in Bulandshahr, he is a strong Jaat leader. He has not received any formal education.

Political career
Gajendra Singh has been a  MLA for two terms. He represented the Anupshahr constituency and is a member of the Bahujan Samaj Party political party.

He lost his seat in the 2017 Uttar Pradesh Assembly election to Sanjay of the Bharatiya Janata Party.

Posts held

See also
 Anupshahr (Assembly constituency)
 Sixteenth Legislative Assembly of Uttar Pradesh
 Uttar Pradesh Legislative Assembly

References 

1975 births
Living people
Uttar Pradesh MLAs 2007–2012
Bahujan Samaj Party politicians from Uttar Pradesh
Uttar Pradesh MLAs 2012–2017